The 42nd Parliament of British Columbia was chosen in the 2020 British Columbia general election. All 87 seats were up for election.

The 41st Parliament of British Columbia was dissolved on September 21, 2020. The 42nd Parliament convened for its first session on December 7, 2020.

Party standings

Election and appointments
The members of the legislative assembly were elected in the 42nd general election, held on October 24, 2020. The election resulted in an absolute majority for the BC NDP, and after a judicial recount in West Vancouver-Sea to Sky the final results had 57 BC NDP members, 28 BC Liberals, and 2 BC Greens being certified. As leader of the BC NDP, John Horgan continued from the previous parliament as premier. Even though BC Liberal leader Andrew Wilkinson won his riding in Vancouver-Quilchena, he resigned as leader of the Opposition prior to the new parliament commencing, with Shirley Bond assuming that position and being interim leader of the BC Liberals. In replacing members of his Executive Council that had retired, Horgan added newly elected MLAs Jennifer Whiteside as minister of Education, Murray Rankin as minister of Indigenous Relations, and Josie Osborne as minister of Municipal Affairs, as well as Nathan Cullen as minister of state for Lands and Natural Resources. Continuing in their roles from the previous parliament, Adrian Dix continued as minister of Health, David Eby as attorney general, George Heyman as minister of Environment, Harry Bains as minister of Labour, Lana Popham as minister of Agriculture, and Mike Farnworth as solicitor general.

First session
The first session of the 42nd parliament began on December 17, 2020, with the speech from the throne delivered by Lieutenant Governor Janet Austin on behalf of Premier Horgan and the BC NDP government. The first session only lasted four months, with all bills receiving royal assent by the end of March. Among the legislation adopted, the Firearm Violence Prevention Act (Bill 4) repealed and replaced the Firearm Act and included new measures as recommended in the 2017 report from a previous parliament's Illegal Firearms Task Force, such as a prohibition on the sale of imitation and low-velocity guns to youth. Bill 5 created the position of the Fairness Officer at ICBC to replace the corporation's Fairness Commissioner; Bill 8 brought the Real Estate Council of BC and the Office of the Superintendent of Real Estate under the regulatory authority of the BC Financial Services Authority; and Bill 9 amended how local government elections are conducted by regulating activities during a defined pre-campaign period, limiting sponsorship contributions and creating a registry of elector organizations.

Second session
The second session began on April 12, 2021, with a new speech from the throne delivered by Lieutenant Governor Austin. There were no changes to the membership of the Executive Council, though Mike Farnworth was named deputy premier in October after Horgan was diagnosed with throat cancer. Budget measures were implemented in Bill 4 and included freezing the carbon tax for one year, creating the BC Recovery Benefit as a one-time payment of $500 per individual on income assistance, creating the temporary Increased Employment Incentive program for employers to hire new employees, extending the book publishing tax credit by 5 years, and increasing the tobacco tax. COVID-related legislation included a new entitlement for employees to receive paid leave to receive a vaccination against COVID‐19, prohibiting until July 2023 any conduct that disrupts access to COVID-19 vaccination sites or hospitals with emergency rooms, making permanent several temporary measures allowing electronic local government council meetings, and extending the COVID-19 Related Measures Act to December 31, 2022.

New acts adopted with all-party support included the Accessible British Columbia Act, to allow accessibility-related regulations to be implemented affecting the built environment, delivery of government services, and in the health and education sectors; and the Early Childhood Educators Act, to create oversight of early childhood educators. With all-party support, the Early Learning and Child Care Act repealed and replaced the Child Care BC Act and the Child Care Subsidy Act. With the BC Liberal Party voting to oppose, the InBC Investment Corp. Act was adopted to create a new Crown corporation to administer a new small business investment fund. 

Significant amendments to existing legislation, with all-party support, included adding "Indigenous identity" to the BC Human Rights Code and adding "single-use product" (i.e. plastics) to the list of packaging materials that may be regulated or prohibited. On division, with the BC Liberal Party opposed, the Electoral Boundaries Commission Act was amended to increase the number of electoral districts from 87 to 93 and remove the provisions that required a certain number to be located in the North, the Cariboo-Thompson and the Columbia-Kootenay regions despite population factors; and forestry-related legislation was amended to require forestry companies to publicly disclose where operations will occur, replace forest stewardship plans with forest landscape plans with a new set of objectives, require licence holders maintain inventories of ecosystems, recreation-visual resources, reduce annual allowable cuts for purposes of redistribution to small businesses and create a new designation for non-timber production purpose. With both Liberals and Green Party MLAs voting against, the Freedom of Information and Protection of Privacy Act was amended to allow data-hosting outside of BC and allow disclosure of personal information outside Canada and to create a fee to apply for a freedom-of-information request.

Officeholders

Speaker
 Speaker of the Legislative Assembly: Raj Chouhan, NDP (December 7, 2020 – present)

Other chair occupants
 Deputy speaker: Spencer Chandra Herbert, NDP (December 7, 2020 – present)
 Assistant deputy speaker: Jackie Tegart, Liberal (February 7, 2022 – present)
 Deputy chair, Committee of the Whole: Ronna-Rae Leonard, NDP (December 7, 2020 – present)

Leaders
 Premier of British Columbia: 
 John Horgan, NDP (July 18, 2017 – November 18, 2022)
 David Eby, NDP (November 18, 2022 – present)
 Leader of the Opposition: 
 Andrew Wilkinson, Liberal (February 3, 2018 – November 23, 2020)
 Shirley Bond, Liberal (interim; November 23, 2020 – February 5, 2022)
 Kevin Falcon, Liberal (February 5, 2022 – present)
 Green Party leader: 
 Sonia Furstenau (September 14, 2020 – present)

House leaders
 Government House Leader: Ravi Kahlon, NDP
 Opposition House Leader: Peter Milobar, Liberal

Members of the 42nd Parliament

 The name in bold and italics, with "", is the premier
The names in bold, with "", are cabinet ministers and ministers of state
The name in italics, with "" is the leader of the Official Opposition

Party standings

References 

Political history of British Columbia
Terms of British Columbia Parliaments
Parliament, 42
Parliament, 42
British Columbia Parliament, 42